The Royal Naval Engineering College was a specialist establishment for the training of Royal Navy engineers. It was founded as Keyham College in 1880, new buildings were opened in Manadon, Devon in 1940 and the old college site at Keyham closed in 1958.  The college was renamed HMS Thunderer in 1946, and closed in 1995.

RNEC Keyham

Construction of Keyham College on the dockside in the Keyham suburb of Plymouth started in February 1879, at a cost of £30,000 and opened in July 1880 as Training Schools for Engineer Students, replacing the hulk of HMS Marlborough which had been used as accommodation for engineering students since 1877.  Students spent five years living at the college, and undergoing  training in workshops around the dockyard, before spending a further two years at Greenwich college and then assigned to ships as Assistant Engineers.

The college originally only contained accommodation, replacing that provided by Marlborough, but an additional building was later constructed containing lecture theatres, a laboratory and a gymnasium which was subsequently converted to a test engineering shop. The two buildings were connected by a bridge. Later further workshops were added, as was a covered parade ground. An extension to provide accommodation for an additional 50 students was built in 1895–1897.

The Selborne-Fisher scheme of 1903 meant that engineering and deck officers received the same basic training and led the closure of the college in 1910. However it reopened in July 1913 and on the outbreak of the First World War the following year the students were sent off to serve on warships and the college turned over to special entry cadet training. After the war, the college reverted to engineer training.

RNEC Manadon
Plans were announced in 1937 to move the college to Manadon, and the new college opened in May 1940 at the manor house, expanding rapidly during the Second World War. By 1945 there were several new permanent and temporary buildings on the site, and the original manor house was being used for staff accommodation.

In December 1946 the RNEC Manadon had been renamed HMS Thunderer. Further permanent building work took place following the end of the war, with a recreation block completed in 1947, and the instructional block, boiler house and factory workshop completed in 1951.

The old Keyham College closed in 1958 and was converted to the Dockyard Technical College, reopening in November 1959. The buildings were demolished in 1985.

HMS Thunderer produced around 150 RN engineer officers each year.  In addition, a small number of seaman branch officers read for undergraduate arts degrees at the college. This continued until 1995 with the final Manadon students completing their 3rd year of BEng or BA degrees at Plymouth University in 1996. In parallel, in-service first degree education transferred to the University of Southampton from 1994. Postgraduate application training that had previously been conducted at RNEC Manadon transferred to HMS Sultan (marine and air engineering) and HMS Collingwood (weapon engineering). Various artefacts from the instructional blocks and Wardroom at RNEC Manadon are on display at these two establishments.

The site of the former RNEC at Manadon, Plymouth was sold off and has now been transformed into housing.

Commanding officers
Included 
 Commander R. W. Hope, – 1 June 1880 – 20 December 1880
 Commander: W. M. Annesley, – 20 December 1883 – 20 December 1885
 Commander: W. D. Morrish, – 20 December 1885 – 7 January 1892
 Commander: T. B. Triggs, – 7 January 1892 – 6 January 1895
 Commander A. B. Grenfell – 6 January 1895 – 7 January 1898
 Commander: H. Talbot, – 7 January 1898 – 1 October 1900
 Commander: A. E. Tizard, – 1 October 1900 – 6 December 1902
 Captain: Robert S. Lowry, – 6 December 1902 – 6 December 1905
 Rear-Admiral: T. H. Martyn Jerram, – 6 December 1905 – 30 July 1908
 Captain: L. G. Tufnell, CMG – 30 July 1908 – 15 August 1913
 Engineer Captain: C. G. Taylor, – MVO, 15 August 1913 – 14 September 1914
 Captain: G. R. Mansell, MVO – 14 September 1914 – 23 August 1918
 Captain: H. J. T. Marshall, – 23 August 1918 – 1 January 1920
 Engineer Captain: H. Lashmore, CB DSO – 1 January 1920 – 13 September 1921
 Engineer Rear Admiral: H. Lashmore, CB DSO – 13 September 1921 – 2 January 1922
 Engineer Captain: R. B. Morison, CMG – 2 January 1922 – 1 January 1925
 Engineer Captain: E. P. St J. Benn, CB ADC – 1 January 1925 – 11 April 1927
 Engineer Rear Admiral: E. P. St J. Benn, CB ADC – 11 April 1927 – 7 August 1927
 Engineer Captain: A. L. Picton, – 7 August 1927 – 7 June 1930
 Engineer Captain: E. L. D.  Acland, MVO ADC – 7 June 1930 – 19 September 1933
 Engineer Captain R. C. Boddie, CVO DSO ADC – 19 September 1933 – 12 September 1936
 Engineer Rear Admiral: R. C. Boddie, CVO DSO ADC – 12 September 1936 – 2 December 1936
 Engineer Captain: T. Spalding, – 2 December 1936 – 21 December 1938
 Engineer Captain: C. J. G. MacKenzie, CVO – 21 December 1938 – 27 November 1941
 Captain (E): B. L. G. Sebastian, ADC – 27 November 1941 – 29 March 1944
 Captain (E): W. D. Brown, DSO – 29 March 1944 – 6 November 1946
 Captain (E): F. V. Stopford, ADC – 6 November 1946 – 5 November 1948
 Captain (E): J. G. C. Given, CBE – 5 November 1948 – 16 November 1951
 Captain (E): L A B Peile, DSO MVO – 16 November 1951 – 19 December 1953
 Captain: C Gatey, CBE – 19 December 1953 – 26 May 1956
 Captain: Sir John Walsham, Bt OBE – 26 May 1956 – 7 August 1958
 Captain: Ian G. Aylen, OBE DSO – 7 August 1958 – 7 July 1960
 Rear Admiral: Ian G. Aylen, OBE DSO – 7 July 1960 – 30 July 1960
 Captain: R. C. Paige, – 30 July 1960 – 30 August 1962
 Captain: W. T. C. Ridley, OBE – 30 August 1962 – 26 October 1964
 Captain: W. B. S. Milln, MVO – 26 October 1964 – 28 March 1967
 Captain Nigel Malim, MVO – 28 March 1967 - 24 June 1969 
 Captain: D. G. Satow, – 24 June 1969 – 22 April 1971
 Captain: C. P. H. Gibbon, – 22 April 1971 – 31 May 1973
 Captain: W. T. Pillar, – 31 May 1973 – 29 October 1975
 Captain: R. G. Baylis, OBE – 29 October 1975 – 9 May 1978
 Captain: P. G. Hammersley, OBE – 9 May 1978 – 2 June 1980
 Captain: G. G. W. Marsh, OBE MA – 2 June 1980 – 31 July 1982
 Captain: R. V. Holley, – 31 July 1982 – 17 August 1984
 Captain R. A. Isaac, – 17 August 1984 – 5 August 1986
 Captain: I. H. Pirnie, ADC MA – 5 August 1986 – 16 February 1988
 Captain: J. A. Marshall, LVO – 16 February 1988 – 20 April 1990
 Captain: T. J. England – 20 April 1990 – 7 August 1992
 Captain: D. G. Littlejohns, – 7 August 1992 – 25 May 1994
 Captain: B. M. Leavey, – 25 May 1994 – 5 July 1994
 Captain: P. A. M. Thomas – 5 July 1994

References

External links

Buildings and structures in Plymouth, Devon
Education in Plymouth, Devon
Educational institutions disestablished in 1995
Engineering education in the United Kingdom
1995 disestablishments in the United Kingdom
Training establishments of the Royal Navy